The 2020 United States House of Representatives elections in Georgia were held on November 3, 2020, to elect the 14 U.S. representatives from the state of Georgia, one from each of the state's 14 congressional districts. The elections coincided with the 2020 U.S. presidential election, as well as other elections to the House of Representatives, elections to the United States Senate and various state and local elections.

Primaries were held on June 9, 2020, coinciding with primaries for U.S. President, U.S. Senate, General Assembly, county and regional prosecutorial offices as well as local non-partisan elections. It was the first time since 1994 that both major parties contested all congressional districts in the state, even though the Democratic nominee for the 14th district had suspended his campaign prior to the general election; it was also the first time since 2012 that Republicans contested all districts, as it was for Democrats for the first time since 2008.

Overview 
{|class="wikitable plainrowheaders sortable" style="font-size:100%; text-align:right;"
! scope=col rowspan=3|District
! scope=col colspan=2|Republican
! scope=col colspan=2|Democratic
! scope=col colspan=2|Total
! scope=col rowspan=3|Result
|-
! scope=col colspan=2 style="background:"|  !! scope=col colspan=2 style="background:"| !! scope=col colspan=2|
|-
! scope=col data-sort-type="number"|Votes !! scope=col data-sort-type="number"|% !! scope=col data-sort-type="number"|Votes !! scope=col data-sort-type="number"|% !! scope=col data-sort-type="number"|Votes !! scope=col data-sort-type="number"|%
|- 
| align=left| || 189,457 || 58.35% || 135,238 || 41.65% || 324,695 || 100.0% ||  align=left|Republican hold
|- 
| align=left| || 111,620 || 40.88% || 161,397 || 59.12% || 273,017 || 100.0% ||  align=left|Democratic hold
|- 
| align=left| || 241,526 || 65.05% || 129,792 || 34.95% || 371,318 || 100.0% ||  align=left|Republican hold
|- 
| align=left| || 69,393 || 19.92% || 278,906 || 80.08% || 348,299 || 100.0% ||  align=left|Democratic hold
|- 
| align=left| || 52,646 || 14.85% || 301,857 || 85.15% || 354,503 || 100.0% ||  align=left|Democratic hold
|- 
| align=left| || 180,329 || 45.41% || 216,775 || 54.59% || 397,104 || 100.0% ||  align=left|Democratic hold
|- 
| align=left| || 180,564 || 48.61% || 190,900 || 51.39% || 371,464 || 100.0% ||  align=left|Democratic gain'|- 
| align=left| || 198,701 || 64.52% || 109,264 || 35.48% || 307,965 || 100.0% ||  align=left|Republican hold
|- 
| align=left| || 292,750 || 78.58% || 79,797 || 21.42% || 372,547 || 100.0% ||  align=left|Republican hold
|- 
| align=left| || 235,810 || 62.31% || 142,636 || 37.69% || 378,446 || 100.0% ||  align=left|Republican hold
|- 
| align=left| || 245,259 || 60.43% || 160,623 || 39.57% || 405,882 || 100.0% ||  align=left|Republican hold
|- 
| align=left| || 181,038 || 58.49% || 129,061 || 41.69% || 309,544 || 100.0% ||  align=left|Republican hold
|- 
| align=left| || 81,476 || 22.60% || 279,045 || 77.40% || 360,521 || 100.0% ||  align=left|Democratic hold
|- 
| align=left| || 229,827 || 74.71% || 77,798 || 25.29% || 307,625 || 100.0% ||  align=left|Republican hold
|- class="sortbottom" style="font-weight:bold"
| align=left|Total || 2,490,393 || 51.00% || 2,393,089 || 49.00% || 4,882,930 || 100.0% || 
|}

 District 1 

The 1st district comprises the entire coastal area of Sea Islands and much of the southeastern part of the state. In addition to Savannah, the district includes the cities of Brunswick, Jesup, and Waycross. The incumbent is Republican Buddy Carter, who was re-elected with 57.7% of the vote in 2018.

 Republican primary 
 Candidates 
 Declared 
Buddy Carter, incumbent U.S. Representative
Daniel Merritt, businessman and U.S. Army veteran
Ken Yasger, U.S. Army veteran

Endorsements

Primary results

Democratic primary
Candidates
Declared
Joyce Griggs, Retired Lt. Col. and businesswoman
Lisa Ring, chairwoman of the Bryan County Democratic Party and nominee for Georgia's 1st congressional district in 2018
 Barbara Seidman, retired businesswoman

Primary results

Runoff results

General election
Predictions

Results

District 2

The 2nd district encompasses rural southwestern Georgia, taking in Macon, Albany, and Columbus. The incumbent is Democrat Sanford Bishop, who was re-elected with 59.7% of the vote in 2018.

Democratic primary
Candidates
Declared
Sanford Bishop, incumbent U.S. Representative

Primary results

Republican primary
Candidates
Declared
Vivian Childs, businesswoman and former educator
Don Cole, former speechwriter for U.S. Agriculture Secretary Sonny Perdue

Primary results

General election
Predictions

Results

District 3

The third district takes in the southwestern exurbs of Atlanta, including Coweta County and parts of Fayette County. The incumbent is Republican Drew Ferguson, who was re-elected with 65.5% of the vote in 2018.

Republican primary
Candidates
Declared
Drew Ferguson, incumbent U.S. Representative

Primary results

Democratic primary
Candidates
Declared
Val Almonord, retired physician

Primary results

General election
Predictions

Results

District 4

The 4th district encompasses the eastern suburbs of Atlanta, taking in Conyers, Covington, Decatur, Lilburn, and Lithonia. The incumbent is Democrat Hank Johnson, who was re-elected with 78.9% of the vote in 2018.

Democratic primary
Candidates
Declared
William Haston, contractor
Hank Johnson, incumbent U.S. Representative
Elaine Amankwah Nietmann, attorney

Endorsements

Primary results

Republican primary
Candidates
Declared
Johsie Cruz Ezammudeen, activist

Primary results

General election
Predictions

Results

District 5

The 5th district is centered on Downtown Atlanta. Incumbent Democrat John Lewis initially ran for re-election to an eighteenth term before he died in office on July 17, 2020. A special election was held on September 29, 2020, which advanced to a runoff scheduled for December 1. As a result, the seat was vacant before the general election. Democrat Kwanza Hall was eventually elected in the runoff and served the remainder of Lewis's term.

Democratic primary
Candidates
Declared
John Lewis, incumbent U.S. Representative (died in office July 17, 2020)
Barrington D. Martin II, paralegal

Endorsements

Primary results

Nominating committee
Following Lewis's death, the Georgia Democratic Party received 131 applications for candidates to nominate, and announced five finalists:
 Park Cannon, state representative
 Andre Dickens, Atlanta city councillor
 Robert Michael Franklin Jr., former President of Morehouse College
 Nikema Williams, state senator and chair of the Georgia Democratic Party
 James Woodall, President of the Georgia NAACP
The party's 45-member Executive Committee selected Williams, with Cannon receiving two votes and Woodall receiving one.

Republican primary
Candidates
Declared
Angela Stanton-King, author and criminal justice advocate

Primary results

General election
Predictions

Results

District 6

The 6th district covers the northern suburbs of Atlanta, encompassing eastern Cobb County, northern Fulton County, and northern DeKalb County. The district includes all or parts of Roswell, Johns Creek, Tucker, Alpharetta, Marietta, Milton, Mountain Park, Sandy Springs, Brookhaven, Chamblee, Doraville, and Dunwoody. The incumbent is Democrat Lucy McBath, who flipped the district and was elected with 50.5% of the vote in 2018.

Democratic primary
Candidates
Declared
Lucy McBath, incumbent U.S. Representative

Primary results

Republican primary
Candidates
Declared
Mykel Barthelemy, minister and businesswoman
Karen Handel, former U.S. Representative
Blake Harbin, businessman
Joe Profit, businessman, former NFL player, and nominee for Georgia's 4th congressional district in 2018
Paulette Smith, activist

Withdrawn
Brandon Beach, state senator
Donnie Bolena, small business owner and former mayoral candidate in Sandy Springs
Marjorie Taylor Greene, businesswoman (running in the 14th district)
Nicole Rodden, former U.S. Merchant Marine

Declined
Tom Price, former U.S. Secretary of Health and Human Services and former U.S. Representative

Primary results

General election
Predictions

Endorsements

Organizations
 Black Economic Alliance
 Congressional Black Caucus
 EMILY's List
 End Citizens United
 Humane Society of the United States Legislative Fund
 League of Conservation Voters Action Fund
 NARAL Pro-Choice America
 Planned Parenthood Action Fund
 Sierra Club
 Human Rights Campaign

Polling

with Generic Democrat and Generic Republican

Results

District 7

The 7th district covers the northeast Atlanta metropolitan area, encompassing almost all of Gwinnett and Forsyth counties. It includes the cities of Peachtree Corners, Norcross, Cumming, Lawrenceville, Duluth, Snellville, Suwanee, and Buford. The incumbent is Republican Rob Woodall, who was re-elected with 50.1% of the vote in 2018, and subsequently announced he would not seek re-election on February 7, 2019.

Republican primary
Candidates
Declared
Lisa Babbage, professor, author, board member of the Gwinnett County Republican Party and former member of the Georgia Republican Party state committee
Mark Gonsalves, businessman
Lynne Homrich, former human resources manager and nonprofit executive
Zachary Kennemore, hotel night auditor
Rich McCormick, physician
Renee Unterman, state senator
Eugene Yu, businessman and perennial candidate

Withdrawn
Ben Bullock, U.S. Air Force veteran and real estate investor (running in the 14th district)
Harrison Floyd, former U.S. Marine
Lerah Lee
Joe Profit, businessman, former NFL player, and nominee for Georgia's 4th congressional district in 2018 (Running for GA-06)

Declined
Buzz Brockway, former state representative and candidate for Secretary of State in 2018 
David Clark, state representative
Rick Desai, businessman and former chair of the Georgia Indo-American Chamber of Commerce
Shane Hazel, former U.S. Marine and candidate for Georgia's 7th congressional district in 2018 
Scott Hilton, former state representative
Todd Jones, state representative
P. K. Martin IV, state senator
B. J. Pak, U.S. Attorney for the Northern District of Georgia
Narender Reddy, businessman and Georgia Regional Transportation Authority board member
Mike Royal, state school board member and former chair of the Gwinnett County Republican Party
David Shafer, former state senator
Rob Woodall, incumbent U.S. Representative

Endorsements

Polling

Primary results

Democratic primary
Candidates
Declared
Carolyn Bourdeaux, Georgia State University public policy professor, former director of the Georgia Senate Budget Office, and nominee for Georgia's 7th congressional district in 2018 
John Eaves, former chair of the Fulton County Commission
Nabilah Islam, activist
Zahra Karinshak, state senator
Rashid Malik, author and entrepreneur
Brenda Lopez Romero, state representative

Withdrawn
Marqus Cole, attorney

Declined
Pedro Marin, state representative
Sam Park, state representative

Endorsements

Primary results

General election
Predictions

Polling

Endorsements

Results

District 8

The 8th district takes in south-central Georgia, including Warner Robins and Valdosta. The incumbent,  Republican Austin Scott, was re-elected with 99.7% of the vote without major-party opposition in 2018 , and last faced Democratic opposition in 2016 .

Republican primary
Candidates
Declared
Vance Dean, business consultant
Danny Ellyson, Iraq War veteran
Austin Scott, incumbent U.S. Representative

Primary results

Democratic primary
Candidates
Declared
Lindsay "Doc" Holliday, dentist and environmental activist

Primary results

General election
Predictions

Results

District 9

The 9th district encompasses northeastern Georgia, including the city of Gainesville as well as part of Athens. The incumbent is Republican Doug Collins, who was re-elected with 79.5% of the vote in 2018 . On January 29, 2020 , Collins announced he would be running for the U.S. Senate seat currently held by appointed U.S. Senator Kelly Loeffler, and thus would not seek re-election.

Republican primary
Candidates
Declared
Michael Boggus, construction worker
Paul Broun, former U.S. Representative for Georgia's 10th congressional district (2007–2015  )
Andrew Clyde, firearms business-owner and U.S. Navy veteran
Matt Gurtler, state representative
Maria Strickland, retired police officer
Kevin Tanner, state representative
Ethan Underwood, property rights attorney
Kellie Weeks, gun shop owner
John Wilkinson, state senator

Declined
Doug Collins, incumbent U.S. Representative (running for U.S. Senate)

Endorsements

Primary results

Runoff results

Democratic primary
Candidates
Declared
Devin Pandy, former U.S. Army Warrant officer
Brooke Siskin, businesswoman
Dan Wilson, retired pastor

Primary results

Runoff results

General election
Predictions

Results

District 10

The 10th district is located in east-central Georgia, taking in Athens, Eatonton, Jackson, Milledgeville, Monroe, Watkinsville, and Winder. The incumbent is Republican Jody Hice, who was re-elected with 62.9% of the vote in 2018 .

Republican primary
Candidates
Declared
Jody Hice, incumbent U.S. Representative

Primary results

Democratic primary
Candidates
Declared
Andrew Ferguson, screenwriter
Tabitha Johnson-Green, registered nurse and nominee for Georgia's 10th congressional district in 2018

Primary results

General election
Predictions

Results

District 11

The 11th district covers the northwest Atlanta metropolitan area, including Cartersville, Marietta, Woodstock, and parts of Atlanta proper. The incumbent is Republican Barry Loudermilk, who was re-elected with 61.8% of the vote in 2018 .

Republican primary
Candidates
Declared
Barry Loudermilk, incumbent U.S. Representative

Primary results

Democratic primary
Candidates
Declared
 Dana Barrett, radio talk show host

Withdrawn
Rachel Kinsey, businesswoman
Asher Nuckolls, physics teacher

Primary results

General election
Predictions

Results

District 12

The 12th district is centered around Augusta and takes in the surrounding rural areas. The incumbent is Republican Rick Allen, who was re-elected with 59.5% of the vote in 2018 .

Republican primary
Candidates
Declared
Rick W. Allen, incumbent U.S. Representative

Primary results

Democratic primary
Candidates
Declared
Elizabeth Johnson, retired insurance professional
Dan Steiner, retired attorney

Primary results

General election
Predictions

Results

District 13

The 13th district covers the southwestern suburbs of Atlanta, including Austell, Jonesboro, Mableton, Douglasville, Stockbridge, and Union City, and part of southern Atlanta proper. The incumbent is Democrat David Scott, who was re-elected with 76.2% of the vote in 2018 .

Democratic primary
Candidates
Declared
Michael Owens, former chair of the Cobb County Democratic Party and candidate for Georgia's 13th congressional district in 2014
Jannquell Peters, former mayor of East Point
David Scott, incumbent U.S. Representative
Keisha Waites, former state representative

Endorsements

Primary results

Republican primary
Candidates
Declared
Caesar Gonzales, aerospace engineer
Becky E. Hites, steel industry consultant

Primary results

General election
Predictions

Results

District 14

The 14th district encompasses rural northwestern Georgia, including Rome and Dalton. The incumbent was Republican Tom Graves, who was re-elected with 76.5% of the vote in 2018 . On December 5, 2019, Graves announced he would not seek re-election.

In the Republican primary, neurologist John Cowan, and noted conspiracy theorist Marjorie Taylor Greene, advanced to the runoff election on August 11. After the first round of the election, Politico'' unearthed videos published by Greene where she expressed racist, anti-Semitic, and Islamophobic views, which led to condemnations from Kevin McCarthy and Steve Scalise. Greene defeated Cowan in the Republican runoff on August 11, 2020.

Democrat Kevin Van Ausdal suspended his campaign for "personal and family reasons" on September 11, 2020. It later emerged that he opted to move in with relatives in Indiana after being forced to vacate his house under the terms of a pending divorce. Reportedly, his wife divorced him because of death threats they were receiving. He did not have enough money to pay for a place to live while the divorce was pending, and federal campaign finance law does not allow candidates to use campaign funds for housing. As a result, Van Ausdal was forced to move out of Georgia, which made him ineligible for the seat. House candidates are required to at least live in the state they wish to represent.

Republican primary

Candidates

Declared
John Barge, former Georgia State School Superintendent
Ben Bullock, U.S. Air Force veteran and real estate investor
Kevin Cooke, state representative
John Cowan, neurologist
Clayton Fuller, attorney and former White House Fellow
Marjorie Taylor Greene, businesswoman and proponent of the QAnon conspiracy theory
Andy Gunther, U.S. Army veteran and U.S. HUD inspector
Bill Hembree, former state representative
Matt Laughridge, businessman

Declined
Jason Anavitarte, member of Paulding County school board
Boyd Austin, mayor of Dallas
Bob Barr, former U.S. Representative for Georgia's 7th congressional district (1995–2003 )
Charlice Byrd, former state representative
 Katie Dempsey, state representative
Tom Graves, incumbent U.S. Representative
Micah Gravley, state representative
Chuck Hufstetler, state senator
Trey Kelley, majority whip of the Georgia House of Representatives
Eddie Lumsden, state representative
Jeff Mullis, state senator
Chuck Payne, state senator

Endorsements

Primary results

Runoff polling

Runoff results

Democratic primary

Candidates

Withdrawn
Kevin Van Ausdal, financial technology professional (Nominated, but suspended his campaign on September 11, 2020 .)

Primary results

General election

Endorsements

Predictions

Results

See also
 Voter suppression in the United States 2019–2020  : Georgia
 2020 Georgia (U.S. state) elections

Notes 

Partisan clients

References

Further reading

External links
 
  (State affiliate of the U.S. League of Women Voters)
Elections  at the Georgia Secretary of State official website

 
 

Official campaign websites for 1st district candidates
 Buddy Carter (R) for Congress
 Joyce Griggs (D) for Congress 

Official campaign websites for 2nd district candidates
 Sanford Bishop (D) for Congress
 Don Cole (R) for Congress 

Official campaign websites for 3rd district candidates
 Val Almonord (D) for Congress
 Drew Ferguson (R) for Congress

Official campaign websites for 4th district candidates
 Johsie Cruz Ezammudeen (R) for Congress
 Hank Johnson (D) for Congress

Official campaign websites for 5th district candidates
 Angela Stanton-King (R) for Congress 
 Nikema Williams (D) for Congress

Official campaign websites for 6th district candidates
 Karen Handel (R) for Congress
 Lucy McBath (D) for Congress

Official campaign websites for 7th district candidates
 Carolyn Bourdeaux (D) for Congress
 Rich McCormick (R) for Congress

Official campaign websites for 8th district candidates
 Jimmy Cooper (G) for Congress
 Lindsay "Doc" Holliday (D) for Congress
 Austin Scott (R) for Congress

Official campaign websites for 9th district candidates
 Andrew Clyde (R) for Congress
 Devin Pandy (D) for Congress 

Official campaign websites for 10th district candidates
 Jody Hice (R) for Congress
 Tabitha Johnson-Green (D) for Congress

Official campaign websites for 11th district candidates
 Dana Barrett (D) for Congress
 Barry Loudermilk (R) for Congress

Official campaign websites for 12th district candidates
 Rick W. Allen (R) for Congress
 Elizabeth Johnson (D) for Congress
 Donald Keller (I) for Congress

Official campaign websites for 13th district candidates
 Martin Cowen (L) for Congress
 Becky E. Hites (R) for Congress
 David Scott (D) for Congress

Official campaign websites for 14th district candidates
 Marjorie Taylor Greene (R) for Congress

Georgia
2020
House